The 2017 UEFA European Under-21 Championship qualifying competition was a men's under-21 football competition that determined the 11 teams joining the automatically qualified hosts Poland in the 2017 UEFA European Under-21 Championship tournament final. 

A total of 52 UEFA member national teams entered the qualifying competition, with Gibraltar as the only absentee. Players born on or after 1 January 1994 are eligible to participate.

Format
The qualifying competition consists of two rounds:
Qualifying group stage: The 52 teams are drawn into nine groups – seven groups of six teams and two groups of five teams. Each group is played in home-and-away round-robin format. The nine group winners qualify directly for the tournament final, while the four best runners-up (not counting results against the sixth-placed team) advance to the play-offs.
Play-offs: The four teams are drawn into two ties to play home-and-away two-legged matches to determine the last two qualified teams.

Tiebreakers
The teams are ranked according to points (3 points for a win, 1 point for a draw, 0 points for a loss). If two or more teams are equal on points on completion of a group, the following tie-breaking criteria are applied, in the order given, to determine the rankings (Regulations Article 14.01):
Higher number of points obtained in the group matches played among the teams in question;
Superior goal difference from the group matches played among the teams in question;
Higher number of goals scored in the group matches played among the teams in question;
Higher number of goals scored away from home in the group matches played among the teams in question;
If, after having applied criteria 1 to 4, teams still have an equal ranking, criteria 1 to 4 are reapplied exclusively to the group matches between the teams in question to determine their final rankings. If this procedure does not lead to a decision, criteria 6 to 10 apply;
Superior goal difference in all group matches;
Higher number of goals scored in all group matches;
Higher number of away goals scored in all group matches;
Lower disciplinary points total based only on yellow and red cards received in all group matches (red card = 3 points, yellow card = 1 point, expulsion for two yellow cards in one match = 3 points);
Position in the UEFA Under-21 national team coefficient ranking for the qualifying group stage draw.

To determine the four best runners-up from the qualifying group stage, the results against the teams in sixth place are discarded. The following criteria are applied (Regulations Article 14.02):
Higher number of points;
Superior goal difference;
Higher number of goals scored;
Higher number of away goals scored;
Lower disciplinary points total based only on yellow and red cards received (red card = 3 points, yellow card = 1 point, expulsion for two yellow cards in one match = 3 points);
Position in the UEFA Under-21 national team coefficient ranking for the qualifying group stage draw.

In the play-offs, the team that scores more goals on aggregate over the two legs qualifies for the tournament final. If the aggregate score is level, the away goals rule is applied, i.e., the team that scores more goals away from home over the two legs advances. If away goals are also equal, extra time is played. The away goals rule is again applied after extra time, i.e., if there are goals scored during extra time and the aggregate score is still level, the visiting team advances by virtue of more away goals scored. If no goals are scored during extra time, the tie is decided by penalty shoot-out (Regulations Articles 15.01 and 15.02).

Schedule
The qualifying matches are played on dates that fall within the FIFA International Match Calendar.

Qualifying group stage

Draw
The draw for the qualifying group stage was held on 5 February 2015, 09:00 CET (UTC+1), at the UEFA headquarters in Nyon, Switzerland.

The teams were seeded according to their coefficient ranking calculation based on the following:
2011 UEFA European Under-21 Championship tournament final and qualifying competition
2013 UEFA European Under-21 Championship tournament final and qualifying competition
2015 UEFA European Under-21 Championship qualifying competition

Groups 1–7 each contained one team from each of Pots A–F, and Group 8–9 each contained one team from each of Pots A–E. Precautions: certain national teams were not drawn up in the same group. Azerbaijan and Armenia continued to dispute the status of Nagorno-Karabakh, and Russia's continued 2014-15 intervention in Ukraine.

Notes
Teams marked in bold have qualified for the tournament final.

Groups

Group 1

Group 2

Group 3

Group 4

Group 5

Group 6

Group 7

Group 8

Group 9

Ranking of second-placed teams

Play-offs

Draw
The draw for the play-offs was held on 14 October 2016, 13:00 CEST (UTC+2), at the UEFA headquarters in Nyon, Switzerland.

Matches
The two play-off winners qualify for the tournament final.

Qualified teams
The following 12 teams qualify for the tournament final.

1 Bold indicates champion for that year. Italic indicates host for that year.
2 As Czechoslovakia
3 As West Germany
4 As Yugoslavia
5 As Serbia and Montenegro

Top goalscorers
Players with six goals or more.

10 goals

 Patrik Schick

9 goals

 Michael Gregoritsch
 Uroš Đurđević

8 goals

 Marcus Ingvartsen
 Gerard Deulofeu

7 goals

 Stipe Perica
 Davie Selke
 Munir

6 goals

 Aleš Čermák
 Nika Kacharava
 Vincent Janssen

References

External links

 
Qualification
2017
Under-21 Championship qualification
Under-21 Championship qualification
Under-21 Championship qualification